Joann McPike is the founder of Think Global School, an independent non-profit high school that travels the world, giving students the opportunity to study in 12 different international cities over the course of 12 trimester terms. She founded Think Global School in 2010.

A New Zealand native and a current Bahamas resident, McPike has lived in seven countries.

In 2008, she published the photography book Think. McPike’s photographic work has been shown at the Nomade Arts Gallery in Miami, U.S.A. and the West Hill Gallery in Nassau, Bahamas. To commemorate the opening of Think Global School in 2010, she created an outdoor photo installation that accompanied the school during its residencies in Stockholm, Sydney, and Beijing. The exhibit was placed in prominent pedestrian areas and featured documentary style photos from Think, on the themes of tolerance, diversity, and self-reflection that inspire McPike’s school.

References

Living people
Founders of educational institutions
Year of birth missing (living people)